The 1995 Arab Athletics Championships was the ninth edition of the international athletics competition between Arab countries. It took place in Cairo, Egypt from 26 to 28 August. A total of 45 athletics events were contested, 25 for men and 20 for women.

The men's marathon was held for the last time, and for the only time both this and the half marathon event featured on the programme together – a rarity for an athletics championship. The men's 50 kilometres race walk was briefly reintroduced, being contested for the third and final time in the competition's history. In the women's programme, the triple jump was held for the first time, following on from its global debut at the 1993 World Championships in Athletics. In a similar match with international standards, the women's 3000 metres was changed to 5000 metres (parity with the men's event) – a move seen earlier that month at the 1995 World Championships in Athletics. The women's 10,000 metres and half marathon both returned to the programme, having been absent since 1989.

Medal summary

Men

Women

Medal table

Overall

Men

Women

References

Results
 Al Batal Al Arabi(N°:42). Arab Athletics Union. Retrieved on 2015-02-14.

Arab Athletics Championships
International athletics competitions hosted by Egypt
Arab Athletics Championships, 1995
Arab Athletics Championships
Arab Athletics Championships
Arab Athletics Championships, 1995
Arab Athletics Championships
Athletics in Cairo